Kaurab is a Bengali language literary magazine representing innovative, alternative, non-mainstream and experimental genres of Indian literature with an emphasis on poetry and poetics. In vogue for more than three decades, Kaurab continuously streams alternative genres of literature and has published scores of innovative Bengali writers. While some of them are deemed legendary and have been evaluated as literary myths, what keeps the wheel churning at Kaurab today is a whole new generation of creative writing.

The Kaurab literary movement never owned an official manifesto. However, like any other literary upsurge, the emergence of the core group was largely necessitated by social and literary developments in India a quarter century after independence from British colonial rule. The core Kaurab poets and writers represent an interesting break with earlier traditions. Mainstream Bangla literature, back then, was in the thrall of the social, political and cultural upheavals precipitated by the Naxalite movement. While Kaurab, as a literary group, had a camaraderie with the Hungry Generation and other writers of Bengal, it largely attempted to accentuate a fresh and marginal voice that was unheard in Bangla literature. In contrast to the previous literary movements and coteries of the 1960s, Kaurab writers demonstrated greater variety and individuality, a complete nonchalance to existing literary stereotypes, political aloofness, a deep desire to reconnect with the sub-altern, language experiments involving the inner diaspora and a certain high-dreaming flamboyance which little magazines normally undervalue. A lot of these values can be directly attributed to Kaurab's founder editor Kamal Chakrabarty and fellow poets - Deba Prasad Banerjee, Swadesh Sen, Sidhartha Basu, Barin Ghosal, Debajyoti Dutta, Shankar Lahiri, Aryanil Mukhopadhyay & others.

The Kaurab Magazine (Kaurab Patrikaa) has been in print since 1970. In 1982 it won the D. K. Gupta award as the most distinguished Bengali literary magazine. Kaurab's online version, Kaurab Online, is an electronic webzine of poetry and poetics, and houses an international translation and poetry book review archive. The webzine began in 1998, initially as a member site, moving on to becoming an independent dot com site in 2003. The publication of Kaurab's 100th print issue was celebrated in the Indian Museum on 5 December 2004 with a poetry festival. Since then the magazine has been edited by its online editor Aryanil Mukhopadhyay supported by Kaurab's second generation writers Sabyasachi Sanyal, Sudeshna Majumdar and Subhro Bandopadhyay.

In 2007, the new editorial team and its group of poets/writers around the world took the magazine to an unprecedented height by launching an International Poetry Reading/Discussion Series conducted over three continents in three languages - Bengali, English and Spanish. Poets from India, England, Spain, Chile and the US have participated in these events.

The print magazine is currently bi-annual, while the webzine version is tri-annual.

References

External links
Official Kaurab Online site

1970 establishments in West Bengal
Bengali culture
Bengali-language little magazines
Biannual magazines published in India
Literary magazines published in India
Magazines established in 1970
Poetry literary magazines
Triannual magazines